Ballabriggs (foaled 20 April 2001) is a retired Grand National-winning National Hunt racehorse trained by Donald McCain, Jr. in Cholmondeley, Cheshire and owned by Trevor Hemmings.

Racing career
Ballabriggs' racecourse debut was in a 2-mile National Hunt flat race at Uttoxeter on 14 May 2006.  He was ridden by Stephen Craine and finished 5th of 15, beaten 23 lengths, at odds of 13/2.  For the next two seasons he campaigned unsuccessfully over hurdles, before switching to chasing in December 2007.  At Catterick on 18 January 2008, he was ridden for the first time by Jason Maguire who would go on to be the jockey with which he is most closely associated.  At the sixth time of asking, and having finished runner up three times, he finally got off the mark as a chaser, winning a Class 4 Beginners' Chase at Bangor.

In 2010, the gelding came to the fore as a chaser, winning five races in succession, including the Fulke Walwyn Kim Muir Challenge Cup at the Cheltenham Festival at odds of 9/1.

Then in 2011, Ballabriggs had his greatest moment, winning the 2011 Grand National at Aintree Racecourse. Ridden by Maguire, the horse's odds were between 14-1 and 20-1 before the race, but he unexpectedly remained in the leading pack for most of the race, before pulling out in front over the final fences. Ballabriggs finished ahead of Sam Waley-Cohen's Oscar Time in second, and Tony McCoy's Don't Push It in third. Dehydrated in the unusually hot weather, Ballabriggs immediately returned to the stable after the win, instead of going to the winners enclosure as tradition dictates. It was the first time only the jockey entered the winner's enclosure without his mount.

Following his Grand National win Maguire received a five-day ban for excessive use of the whip, Ballabriggs having been driven so hard he required oxygen after the race.

The horse never won again following his National success, although he contested two more Grand Nationals, finishing 6th in 2012, and pulling up in 2013, the final race of his career.

Retirement

He was retired on 13 April 2013 after pulling up in the 2013 Grand National and returned to live on the Isle of Man with owner Trevor Hemmings.  He had run 28 races, winning 7.

Pedigree

References

External links
 Ballabriggs' pedigree and racing stats
  Trainer Donald McCain's Official Website

Grand National winners
2001 racehorse births
Thoroughbred family 3-n
Racehorses bred in Ireland
Racehorses trained in the United Kingdom
National Hunt racehorses
Cheltenham Festival winners